Qeshlaq-e Tulkilu Gol Moradi (also Romanized as Qeshlāq-e Tūlkīlū Gol Morādi) is a village in Qeshlaq-e Gharbi Rural District, Aslan Duz District, Parsabad County, Ardabil Province, Iran. At the 2006 census, its population was 40, in 8 families.

References 

Towns and villages in Parsabad County